Owens Creek is a rural locality in the Mackay Region, Queensland, Australia. In the  Owens Creek had a population of 156 people.

History 
The locality takes its name from the former Owens Creek railway station, assigned by the Queensland Railways Department on 16 March 1922.

In the  Owens Creek had a population of 156 people.

References 

Mackay Region
Localities in Queensland